Nelum Kumara (born 12 March 1979) is a Sri Lankan cricketer. He made his first-class debut for Lankan Cricket Club in the 2005–06 Premier Trophy on 14 January 2006.

References

External links
 

1979 births
Living people
Sri Lankan cricketers
Lankan Cricket Club cricketers
Place of birth missing (living people)